Golden Virgin may refer to:

The Golden Virgin, a 1897 sculpture by Albert Roze
The Golden Virgins, an English pop and rock group

See also
Golden Virginia, an English tobacco brand